CBOSS is an acronym, which may refer to:

 Cellular Biotechnology Operations Support System, a microgravity experiment for cellular biology on the International Space Station delivered by STS-108
 Communications Based Overlay Signal System, a positive train control system being implemented for the Caltrain commuter rail service
 Convergent Business Operation Support System Corporation, a Russia-based telecom company
 DARPA/SPAWAR contract N66001-01-C-8035, which resulted in the development of OpenPAM, a BSD-licensed implementation of PAM